Charles Richard Morris (26 August 1880 – 10 August 1947) was an English cricketer.  Morris was a right-handed batsman.  He was born at Nottingham, Nottinghamshire.

Morris made his first-class debut for Nottinghamshire against Lancashire at Old Trafford in the 1902 County Championship.  He made four further first-class appearances, all of which came in the 1904 County Championship, with his final appearance coming against Sussex at Trent Bridge. In his five first-class appearances for Nottinghamshire, he scored a total of 63 runs at an average of 9.00, with a high score of 24 not out.

He died at Hampstead, London, on 10 August 1947.

References

External links
Charles Morris at ESPNcricinfo
Charles Morris at CricketArchive

1880 births
1947 deaths
Cricketers from Nottingham
English cricketers
Nottinghamshire cricketers